Kevin Malast (born June 6, 1986) is a former American football linebacker. He was signed by the Chicago Bears as an undrafted free agent in 2009. He played college football for Rutgers.

Malast grew up in Manchester Township, New Jersey and played football at Manchester Township High School.

He was also a member of the Jacksonville Jaguars and Tennessee Titans.

References

External links
Tennessee Titans bio 

1986 births
Living people
Players of American football from New Jersey
American football linebackers
Rutgers Scarlet Knights football players
Chicago Bears players
Tennessee Titans players
Jacksonville Jaguars players
People from Manchester Township, New Jersey
Sportspeople from Ocean County, New Jersey